Wendell Mitchell Latimer (April 22, 1893 – July 6, 1955) was an American chemist notable for his description of oxidation states in his book "The Oxidation States of the Elements and Their Potentials in Aqueous Solution" (ASIN B000GRXLSA, first published 1938).

He received his Ph.D from the University of California, Berkeley for the work with George Ernest Gibson.

He earned many awards and honors for his scientific work.

Awards and honors

Latimer received many awards and honor during his lifetime including membership in the National Academy of Sciences, and chairmanship of its Section of Chemistry from 1947 to 1950; the Distinguished Service Award from his alma mater, the University of Kansas, in 1948; the President's Certificate of Merit, in 1948; Faculty Research Lecture in 1953, an honor that the Academic Senate of the University of California annually bestows upon one of its members; the William H. Nichols Medal from the New York Section of the American Chemical Society, in 1955 with a citation for his "Pioneer Studies on the Thermodynamics of Electrolytes, especially the Entropies of Ions in Aqueous Solutions."

Discovery of tritium

In 1933 Latimer used the recently discovered Allison effect to discover tritium. Gilbert N. Lewis bet against his discovery, and he had to pay when Latimer showed him his data. However, that same year the Allison effect was discredited in the eyes of the scientific community, and the discovery of tritium was credited to Ernest Rutherford in 1934. Latimer explained years later he had been unable to reproduce his results, and he couldn't even find where he had gone wrong. The events were cited by Irving Langmuir in his 1953 speech about pathological science

Publications 
"The Oxidation States of the Elements and Their Potentials in Aqueous Solution" ASIN B000GRXLSA  published 1938.

References 

Wendell Mitchell Latimer 

1893 births
1955 deaths
20th-century American chemists
Members of the United States National Academy of Sciences